The 2017–18 Albanian Basketball Superleague, is the 52nd season of the top professional basketball league in Albania.

League started on 13 October 2017 and will end on 13 May 2018.

Competition format
The six clubs played a four-legged round robin tournament where the four first qualified teams would advance to the playoffs.

The fifth qualified team faced the runner-up of the second division in a best-of-three games playoff for avoiding relegation, and the last qualified team was directly relegated.

Clubs and arenas

Regular season

League table

Playoffs
The semi-finals were played in a best-of-three playoff format and the finals in a best-of-five playoff format (1-1-1-1-1).

Bracket

Semi-finals

|}

Finals

|}

Relegation playoffs

|}

References

External links
Albanian Basketball Federation site

Superleague
Albania
Basketball
Basketball